Bigger than the Devil is the second album by crossover thrash band Stormtroopers of Death (S.O.D.). The album was released in May 1999 on the Nuclear Blast label. Its cover design is based on Iron Maiden's 1982 album The Number of the Beast and its title is a play on words on The Beatles member John Lennon proclaiming The Beatles were "bigger (more popular) than Jesus Christ".

Subsequent releases have included both the entire Seasoning the Obese EP—incorporating both tracks "Seasoning the Obese" and "Raise Your Sword"—as well as the "Ballad of the Scorpions" (originally released simply as "Rock You Like a Hurricane" on the Scorpions Tribute Album), bringing the total number of tracks to 28.

"Seasoning the Obese" is a reference to the Slayer song/album Seasons in the Abyss, whereas "Celtic Frosted Flakes" is a reference to the Swiss extreme metal band Celtic Frost.

Anthrax's song "Imitation of Life" on the album Among the Living used the guitar riff from the intro and outro of "Aren't You Hungry?" Subsequently the thrash band M.O.D. used a different riff on their recording of the S.O.D. song.

Track listing
All tracks written by Stormtroopers of Death

Personnel
Stormtroopers of Death (S.O.D.)
Billy Milano – vocals
Scott Ian – guitars, backing vocals
Dan Lilker – bass, backing vocals
Charlie Benante – drums, guitar solo on "Moment Of Truth"

Production
Tim Gilles - producer, engineer
Rich Wielgosz - engineer (assistant)
Vincent Wojno - mixing

References 

Stormtroopers of Death albums
1999 albums
Nuclear Blast albums